Meeru Dhalwala is an author, chef and co-owner, with her ex-husband Vikram Vij, of the Indian restaurants Vij's and Rangoli in Vancouver, British Columbia.

Early life and education 
Meeru Dhalwala was born in India. When she was still young, she moved to Washington, D.C. with her parents. She began her career in D.C., working with various international non-profit organizations on human rights and economic development projects. She attended the University of Bath in England, receiving a master's degree in Development Studies.

Career 

In February 1995, Dhalwala joined her husband, Vikram Vij, in Vancouver, British Columbia. She began managing the kitchen and creating recipes for their newly opened restaurant, Vij's. In the early days, her husband's parents would make the curry at their home and deliver it by bus to the restaurant. By 2003, Mark Bittman of the New York Times was praising Vij's Restaurant as "easily among the finest Indian restaurants in the world".

In 2004, Dhalwala and Vij opened up a second restaurant and market called Rangoli. Both restaurants are known to have an all female kitchen staff, having all come from the Punjab of India. Dhalwala and her cooks experiment together with new techniques and spice combinations. Along with the restaurant recipes, Dhalwala creates recipes for Vij's Inspired Indian Cuisine, a line of prepackaged gourmet curries. The product line is sold in grocery stores across British Columbia, and other regions.

In November 2012, Dhalwala launched a new restaurant called Shanik, in Seattle, Washington. The project was in partnership with Oguz Istif, who is also involved in heading finance and operations for the Vij's companies in Vancouver. Shanik was an Indian restaurant with an original menu, different from her Vij's and Rangoli menus. Shanik closed in March 2015.

Dhalwala and Vij have co-published two cookbooks, with Dhalwala writing the text. In 2006, Dhalwala penned the first, Vij's: Elegant and Inspired Indian Cuisine, which won several awards in 2007, including Cuisine Canada's Gold Award for Best Cookbook and Cordon d'Or Gold Ribbon International Cookbook Award. The book also took first place in the reference category at the Alcuin Society Awards for Excellence in Book Design. In 2010, she penned Vij's at Home: Relax Honey, which placed second in the Best Indian Cuisine Book in the World category at the 2010 Gourmand World Cookbook Awards, and received silver at the Canadian Culinary Book Awards.

Advocacy and Interests 
Dhalwala believes in supporting local business and agriculture, and is committed to improving her business environmental footprint. Within her restaurants, Dhalwala takes strides to build long-term relationships with local farmers and other local suppliers in order to source produce, seafood and meats that align with her philosophy. Dhalwala has added crickets to her restaurant menus, advocating them as a healthy and sustainable food source. She is working to have them farmed locally. Dhalwala is active in the community and sits on the board of Vancouver Farmers Markets. With her restaurant in Seattle, she worked to build relationships with Oregon and Washington farmers, just as she did in British Columbia with her Vancouver restaurants.

Dhalwala actively researches topics around food, the environment and health. This plays a key role in developing her recipes. Dhalwala is particularly interested in sharing her cooking skills with parents who wish to feed their families in a way that is "easy, delicious and healthy". Dhalwala shared her ideas through her regular monthly column in The Vancouver Sun, titled Food for Thought, and a regular Point Person for CBC Radio's 2009 national show The Point. Dhalwala hosts annual cooking shows at the Bowery Whole Foods Kitchen in New York City.
 
Dhalwala is founder and co-organizer of the Joy of Feeding, an annual international food fair held at the UBC Farm in Vancouver. The event serves a fundraiser for the farm and combines a focus on culture, health and the environment. It features around 16 home cooks from various heritages and professions, sharing their home style of comfort foods. Most of the food is sourced organically and/or locally. Dhalwala's vision is to grow the event to "a worldwide Joy of Feeding day where various communities throughout the world gather together to feature and share their home cooked meals".

Bibliography 
 Vij's: Elegant and Inspired Indian Cuisine, with Vikram Vij. Douglas & McIntyre, 2006. .
 Vij's at Home: Relax, Honey: The Warmth and Ease of Indian Cooking, with Vikram Vij. Douglas & McIntyre, 2011. .

References

External links 
 Vij's website
 Joy of Feeding website
 

Living people
Businesspeople from Vancouver
Canadian restaurateurs
Women restaurateurs
Women cookbook writers
Indian emigrants to the United States
American emigrants to Canada
American women writers of Indian descent
American people of Indian descent
American businesspeople
Women chefs
Writers from Vancouver
Year of birth missing (living people)